"Grift of the Magi" is the ninth episode of the eleventh season of the American animated television series The Simpsons. Being the final episode to air in the 1990s, it originally aired on the Fox network in the United States on December 19, 1999. In the episode, mafia boss Fat Tony successfully extorts a large sum of money from Springfield Elementary School, forcing Principal Skinner to close it down. However, a toy company called Kid First Industries, led by Jim Hope, later buys the school and privatizes it. Classes now start focusing on toys and marketing only, and soon a new toy called Funzo that resembles the children's ideas is released by Kid First Industries in time for the Christmas shopping season. Bart and Lisa decide to destroy all Funzos in Springfield but Gary Coleman, Kid First Industries' security guard, tries to intercept them.

"Grift of the Magi", which satirizes the commercialization of Christmas, was written by Tom Martin and directed by Matthew Nastuk. The episode features several guest appearances; Tim Robbins as Jim Hope, Gary Coleman as himself, Joe Mantegna as Fat Tony, and Clarence Clemons as a narrator that tells the viewers at the end of the episode how the story ends.

Around 7.76 million American homes tuned in to watch the episode during its original airing. It was first released on DVD in 2003 in a collection of five Christmas-related Simpsons episodes, titled Christmas With the Simpsons.

Critics have given "Grift of the Magi" generally mixed reviews, particularly because of its plot. The episode has been praised for some of its gags and Coleman's appearance.

Plot
Bart and Milhouse have to remain inside The Simpsons house when an ozone hole moves over Springfield. The two dress up as ladies and jump on the bed, singing "Sisters Are Doin' It for Themselves". When Homer comes in abruptly, Bart falls off of the bed and lands on one of Homer's bowling balls, breaking his coccyx. Dr. Hibbert informs Homer and Marge that Bart will have to use a wheelchair until the bone has healed. When Bart arrives at Springfield Elementary School the following day, he finds that he cannot enter because the school lacks ramps for the disabled. As Principal Skinner considers a ramp for the school, mafia boss Fat Tony suggests that his construction company could build it. Although the new ramp system almost immediately collapses (due to it being made out of breadsticks), Fat Tony informs Skinner that the construction supposedly cost $200,000 and that the school will still have to pay. In response, Principal Skinner decides to close Springfield Elementary due to lack of funds (having used them to pay off Fat Tony and thus avoid brutal mob reprisals).

All pleas for financial help are in vain, including a private school play performed in front of Mr. Burns at his mansion, until Jim Hope, the president of a toy company named Kid First Industries, buys the school and privatizes it. The school's staff is replaced, and classes now focus on toys and marketing. After Lisa is sent to detention for doing math in marketing class, she soon discovers a secret room behind the blackboard, with evidence that the company is using students for research to make a new popular toy in time for the Christmas shopping season. She is then frightened by the appearance of a robotic figure. She tries to show the evidence to Homer, Marge and Chief Wiggum, only for the company to destroy the room beforehand, humiliating her. When Bart and Lisa are back at home, watching television, they see an advertisement for a toy named Funzo. It has many features suggested by Springfield Elementary students during brainstorming sessions at the school, including Lisa's accidental suggestion of the name. They visit Hope's office to complain, and he apologetically gives them a free Funzo toy. Bart and Lisa later discover that Funzo is programmed to destroy other toys.

On Christmas Eve, with Homer's help, the two steal all the Funzo toys from underneath every Christmas tree in Springfield with the intention of burning them in the town's long-running tire fire. However, Gary Coleman, who is a Kid First Industries security guard, comes to stop them. The two parties argue all night; in the morning they settle down into civilized discussion about the commercialization of Christmas. Coleman changes his opinion about the toy company and helps the Simpsons destroy the remaining Funzo toys. Coleman accepts Homer's invitation to Christmas dinner at the Simpsons', cancelling his Christmas plans with George Clooney. Burns shows up, having been visited by three ghosts that night; he has decided to donate to Springfield Elementary. Moe also comes, having decided not to commit suicide after seeing what the world would have been like if he had not been born. He then admits he dented Coleman's Jeep in the driveway. Upon hearing this, Coleman says, "What'chu talkin' 'bout, Moe?" The whole group laughs and Coleman turns around and asks the audience, "What'chu talkin' 'bout, Everyone."

Production

"Grift of the Magi" was written by Tom Martin and directed by Matthew Nastuk as part of the eleventh season of The Simpsons (1999–2000). It was the first episode that Martin wrote on his own, having previously co-written the season ten episode "Sunday, Cruddy Sunday" with George Meyer, Brian Scully, and The Simpsons showrunner Mike Scully. Martin got the inspiration for "Grift of the Magi" after reading a magazine article about how major companies were receiving permission to advertise their products in school students' textbooks. He thought it "seemed like a gigantic conflict that could lead to big problems", and therefore believed an episode based on it would be a good idea. According to DVD Talk reviewer Adam Tyner, the episode is a satire of the commercialization of Christmas. A writer for Newsday has commented that episode skewers "the annual craze for that one 'hot' toy." This has also been pointed out by Mike Scully, who said in 2008 that "Grift of the Magi" was produced around the time when "every year there seemed to be a hot toy. Like the Furbies, or whatever – some toy that kids just had to have that year." In response to Scully's comment, Martin added that every year "the media would create this gigantic rush at the toy store for various things. This [episode] was coming on the heels of, yeah, the Furby."

Guest stars in the episode include Tim Robbins as Jim Hope, Gary Coleman as himself, Joe Mantegna as Fat Tony, and Clarence Clemons as a narrator. Scully thought Robbins "did a great job" because the Simpsons staff wanted the character of Jim Hope to be "fun and upbeat and somebody the kids would love." Clemons narrates a few scenes at the end of the episode, telling the viewers how the story ends. When Coleman agrees to spend Christmas with the Simpsons, Clemons says, for example: "And Gary Coleman was as good as his word, and as for old Mr. Burns, he was visited by three ghosts during the night and agreed to fund the school with some money he found in his tuxedo pants." Shortly after Coleman's death in 2010, an article appeared in the newspaper El Comercio that noted that "the nod to the harsh reality of Gary Coleman in [the episode] is given: in real life a few years ago Gary had to make a living as a shop security guard."

Release

"Grift of the Magi" originally aired on the Fox network in the United States on December 19, 1999. It was viewed in approximately 7.76 million households that night. With a Nielsen rating of 7.7, the episode finished 39th in the ratings for the week of December 13–19, 1999 (tied with an episode of the American Broadcasting Company (ABC)'s 20/20). It was the second highest-rated broadcast on Fox that week, following an episode of Ally McBeal (which received a 9.9 rating). On October 14, 2003, "Grift of the Magi" was released in the United States on a DVD collection titled Christmas With the Simpsons, along with the season one episode "Simpsons Roasting on an Open Fire", the season four episode "Mr. Plow", the season nine episode "Miracle on Evergreen Terrace", and the season thirteen episode "She of Little Faith". On October 7, 2008, the episode was released on DVD again as part of the box set The Simpsons – The Complete Eleventh Season. Staff members Martin, Scully, Meyer, Matt Groening, Ian Maxtone-Graham, Matt Selman, Tim Long, and Lance Kramer participated in the DVD audio commentary for "Grift of the Magi". Deleted scenes from the episode were also included on the box set.

Since airing, "Grift of the Magi" has received generally mixed reviews from critics. While reviewing the eleventh season of The Simpsons, DVD Movie Guide's Colin Jacobson commented that the episode "feels like an amalgamation of elements from prior holiday programs and never really elicits much humor. Christmas is commercialized and corporations use and abuse their customers? Those aren’t exactly rich insights, so ['Grift of the Magi'] comes across as a below average episode." In his review of the DVD Christmas With the Simpsons, Digitally Obsessed critic Joel Cunningham wrote that the episode "comes from Season 11, well past the point when the series had sacrificed character for absurdist humor. Unless you don't think evil toy marketers, sentient Furbys, and Gary Coleman qualify. Anyway, after the school nearly goes bankrupt, Principal Skinner signs a contract with corporate backers who use the kids to conduct market research. There are some good gags, but the story doesn't hang together very well." Adam Tyner of DVD Talk argued that the episode "has a couple of good gags (Gary Coleman chatting on the phone being my favorite) but is quickly forgettable". Brian James of PopMatters described Coleman's cameo as "hysterical" in 2004, and Meghan Lewit of the same website listed "Grift of the Magi" at number eight on her 2009 list of the "10 best holiday themed TV episodes."

References

External links

 
 

1999 American television episodes
American Christmas television episodes
The Simpsons (season 11) episodes